The Waco 6, designed by the Advance Aircraft Company, was a 2-seat biplane similar to the Curtiss JN-4, with single bay equi-span wings. The fuselage was built from wood, fabric covered, with tandem cockpits, the forward one between the mainplanes. Four aircraft were built ca. 1923.

Specifications

References

Biplanes
1920s United States civil aircraft